Birkbeck is an unincorporated community within the Township of Harp, a minor civil division (MCD) of DeWitt County, Illinois, United States.

References

Unincorporated communities in DeWitt County, Illinois
Unincorporated communities in Illinois